Euarestella megacephala is a species of tephritid or fruit flies in the genus Euarestella of the family Tephritidae.

Distribution
Italy

References

Tephritinae
Insects described in 1846
Diptera of Europe